American Gypsy is a funk music group formed in Los Angeles that achieved its greatest success in the Netherlands. In 1974, they had a top ten hit on the Single Top 100 Dutch pop music chart.

The group has performed under various names, including: Blue Morning, Orpheus and Pasadena Ghetto Orchestra.

Members
Musicians who appeared in this band include:
Elout Smit (drums) 1977
Omar Dupree (vocals) 1978
Jetty Weels (vocals) 1978
Lisa Schulte (vocals) 1979
Steve Yellick (keyboards) 1981
Dennis Whitbread (drums) 1981

Discography

References

Dutch rock music groups
Funk rock musical groups